James Dallas Egbert III (October 29, 1962 – August 16, 1980) was a student at Michigan State University who disappeared from his dormitory room on August 15, 1979. The disappearance was widely reported in the press, and his participation in the fantasy role-playing game Dungeons & Dragons was seized upon by press and investigators alike as being potentially related to his disappearance, propelling the previously obscure game to nationwide attention.

Background
Egbert was born in Dayton, Ohio and grew up in Huber Heights, a Dayton suburb, attending Wayne High School. He was a child prodigy, and entered Michigan State University at age 16, where he majored in computer science. Personal problems cited in the reports of his suicide attempt and disappearance include depression, loneliness, parental pressure, drug addiction, and (according to detective William Dear) difficulty in coming to terms with his homosexuality.

Disappearance
Egbert left his dormitory room at Case Hall on August 15, 1979, after writing a suicide note, and entered the university's steam tunnels. He consumed some methaqualone, intending to commit suicide, but he survived. He woke up the next day and went into hiding at a friend's house. Gen Con XII, a convention dedicated to table-top role playing, began that day in Wisconsin, and some attenders reported that they had seen him there.

Investigation
A police search for Egbert began.

On August 22, Egbert's parents hired William Dear, a private investigator who was an acquaintance of Egbert's uncle, to help locate their son.  According to Dear, in their first conversation Egbert's mother raised the possibility that her son had committed suicide, and complained that Michigan State had not notified them that their son was missing until August 20, five days after he was last seen.

On August 24, Michael Stuart, a journalist for the university's newspaper, The State News, published details of the case, including the assertion by an anonymous friend of Egbert's that the missing student was "known to leave campus before for destinations unknown." Stuart's article prompted growing media interest in Egbert's disappearance.

After Dear learned that Egbert had played Dungeons & Dragons, he publicly amplified police theories that Egbert's disappearance was linked to the game.  Students were said to play live-action sessions of the game in the steam maintenance tunnels below the campus, and it was speculated that Egbert had entered the tunnels and had either been injured or lost his way.  This connection of the role-playing game to Egbert's disappearance prompted breathless coverage of both Egbert and the game in media outlets around the U.S. Dungeons & Dragons was described as a "bizarre and secretive cult" which players could only join "by invitation."

The search for Egbert continued unsuccessfully for several weeks.  It was later learned that during this time Egbert moved between two other houses in East Lansing, and then finally left the city via bus for New Orleans.

Discovery, eventual death
While he was in New Orleans, Egbert made a second suicide attempt by consuming a cyanide compound.  This attempt also failed. He then moved on to Morgan City, Louisiana where he found employment as a roustabout.  After only four days on the job, Egbert called Dear and revealed his location. Dear traveled to Louisiana (others reported Texas) and recovered Egbert. Upon their meeting, Egbert asked the investigator to conceal the truth of his story. Dear agreed and released Egbert to the custody of his uncle Marvin Gross on September 13, 1979.

Egbert died of a self-inflicted gunshot wound on August 16, 1980, almost exactly a year after his story generated national attention. In 1984, Dear revealed Egbert's story in The Dungeon Master.

Legacy
The idea of Dungeons & Dragons players acting out real-life sessions in dangerous locations like the steam tunnels and losing touch with reality became ingrained into the cultural consciousness, inspiring books and movies such as Mazes and Monsters. The perceived link between Egbert's disappearance and Dungeons & Dragons was one of several controversies linked to the game during the 1980s. The publicity surrounding the Mazes and Monsters novel and film heightened the public's unease regarding role-playing games. However, it also increased the sales of D&D game manuals considerably, adding to the game's success. For example, "sales of the Basic Set rose dramatically. Right before the steam tunnel incident, the Basic Set might have sold 5,000 copies a month. By the end of 1979, it was trading over 30,000 copies per month, and only going up from there".

References

External links
 "The Disappearance of James Dallas Egbert III" by Shaun Hately
 "The Attacks on Role-Playing Games"  by Paul Cardwell Jr.
 
 

1962 births
1980 deaths
20th-century LGBT people
Gay men
History of role-playing games
LGBT people from Ohio
Michigan State University alumni
People from Dayton, Ohio
People from Huber Heights, Ohio
People with mood disorders
Suicides by firearm in Michigan
Urban legends